Kathleen L. Lodwick (born 1944, died 2022) was an American educator and historian of missions to China.

Biography
Lodwick holds a Ph.D. in Chinese history from the University of Arizona and is a professor of history at Pennsylvania State University at the Lehigh Valley Campus of Penn State Berks-Lehigh Valley College, teaching courses on traditional, modern, and twentieth-century China. Her grandfather, Edward Stephen Worthington, was a direct descendant of Kentucky frontiersman Edward Worthington.

Lodwick has written or contributed to more than a dozen books and articles on Chinese history, especially the history of missionaries in China. Her research has included a history of the Nanjing Theological Seminary under a grant from the Foundation for Theological Education. She published a two-volume index to the Chinese Recorder and Missionary Journal in 1986.

Bibliography
Quien es quien: A Who's Who of Spanish-heritage librarians in the United States (1976) - co-written with Arnulfo D. Trejo 
The Chinese Recorder Index: A Guide to Christian Missions in Asia, 1867-1941 (1986)  
Educating the Women of Hainan: The Career of Margaret Moninger in China, 1915-1942 (1995)
Crusaders Against Opium: Protestant Missionaries in China, 1874-1917 (1996)
The Widow's Quest: The Byers Extraterritorial Case in Hainan, China, 1924-1925 (2003) 
The Missionary Kaleidoscope: Portraits of Six China Missionaries (2005) - co-written with W.K. Cheng

References

Living people
21st-century American historians
American biographers
University of Arizona alumni
Pennsylvania State University faculty
Writers from Pennsylvania
American women historians
21st-century American women writers
American women biographers
1944 births